Roosevelt "Rosie" Manning, Jr. (born May 31, 1950) is a former American football defensive tackle who played four seasons in the National Football League (NFL) with the Atlanta Falcons and Philadelphia Eagles. He was drafted by the Falcons in the second round of the 1972 NFL Draft. He played college football at Northeastern State University and attended Booker T. Washington High School in Wichita Falls, Texas.

References

External links
Just Sports Stats

Living people
1950 births
Players of American football from Texas
American football defensive tackles
Northeastern State RiverHawks football players
Atlanta Falcons players
Philadelphia Eagles players
People from Wichita Falls, Texas